The Kraus House, also known as the Frank Lloyd Wright House in Ebsworth Park, is a house in Kirkwood, Missouri designed by architect Frank Lloyd Wright. The house was designed and constructed for Russell and Ruth Goetz Kraus, and the initial design was conceived in 1950. Construction continued until at least 1960 and was never formally completed. The owners lived in the house for about 40 years (Ruth died in 1992).

The house features parallelograms; indeed, the only right angles to be found in the house are located in the bathroom.  Even the bed is a parallelogram and sheets must be custom made.  The house itself sits on a parallelogram blueprint.  The house features a carport, attached shed, and a workroom for Kraus, a glass work artist.  Kraus heard of Wright's work and was so excited at the thought of living in a work of art himself, he wrote to Wright, who sent him the plans for his 'little house'.

In 1997, the house was recognized with listing on the National Register of Historic Places of the National Park Service. Russell Kraus sold the house in 2001 to a non-profit organization formed for the specific purpose of saving it. The title was subsequently transferred to the St. Louis County Parks and Recreation Department, which maintains the  grounds as Ebsworth Park.  The house and park are open to the public by appointment only. Tours are available for a small fee and do not allow pictures to be taken inside the house.

See also
Parks in Greater St. Louis

Notes

 Storrer, William Allin. The Frank Lloyd Wright Companion. University Of Chicago Press, 2006,  (S.340)

External links

Official web page
Frank Lloyd Wright Foundation
Frank Lloyd Wright Preservation Trust
NPS Form 10-900 for this structure

Frank Lloyd Wright buildings
Houses completed in 1952
Museums in St. Louis County, Missouri
Historic house museums in Missouri
Houses on the National Register of Historic Places in Missouri
Houses in St. Louis County, Missouri
National Register of Historic Places in St. Louis County, Missouri
1952 establishments in Missouri
Tourist attractions in St. Louis